The Grant Public School District is a K–12 public school district located in Grant, Michigan. The district operates in the City of Grant, and the townships of Ashland, Bridgeton, Ensley, Grant, and portions of Casnovia, Garfield, Solon, Tyrone, and Moorland. It is a constituent of the Newaygo County Regional Educational Service Agency, (NCRESA) which is Newaygo County's Intermediate School District.

Grant Public Schools student enrollment is 1,983 (2013–14), which is the second-largest in Newaygo County.

Awards
 In 2008 the Grant High School became one of five schools to be recognized by Conn-Selmer, for having one of the most outstanding high school instrumental music programs in the United States.

Accreditation and memberships
Grant Public Schools is accredited by the North Central Association of Colleges and Schools and is a member of the Central State Activities Association.

References

External links
 

Education in Newaygo County, Michigan
Grand Rapids metropolitan area
School districts in Michigan
School districts established in 1900
1900 establishments in Michigan